A flute sonata is a sonata usually for flute and piano, though occasionally other accompanying instruments may be used. Flute sonatas in the Baroque period were very often accompanied in the form of basso continuo.

List of flute sonatas

George Antheil
Sonata for flute and piano (1951)
Malcolm Arnold
Sonata for flute and piano, Op.121 (1977)
Claude Arrieu
Sonatina for flute and piano (1944)
Carl Philipp Emanuel Bach
Sonata in A minor for solo flute (H. (Helm) 562/Wq. (Wotquenne) 132) (1747)
14 sonatas for flute and continuo
Sonata in G minor for flute and harpsichord, BWV 1020
Sonata in E-flat major for flute and harpsichord, BWV 1031
Sonata in C major for flute and basso continuo, BWV 1033
Johann Christian Bach
Sonatas for keyboard with flute or violin, Op. 16
Johann Sebastian Bach
Sonata in B minor for flute and harpsichord, BWV 1030
Sonata in A major for flute and harpsichord, BWV 1032
Sonata in E minor for flute and basso continuo, BWV 1034
Sonata in E major for flute and basso continuo, BWV 1035
Nicolas Bacri
Spring Sonata for flute and piano, Op. 147 (2018)
Arnold Bax
Sonata for flute and harp (1928)
Lennox Berkeley
Sonata for flute and piano (1978)
Ludwig van Beethoven (attributed)
Flute Sonata in B-flat major, Anh. 4
Flute Sonata No. 1 Op. 40 (1998)
Mélanie Bonis
Flute Sonata in C-sharp minor, Op. 64 (1904)
Pierre Boulez
Sonatina for flute and piano (1946) (1 serial movement)
York Bowen
Flute Sonata, Op. 120 (1946)
Robert J. Bradshaw
Sonata No. 2 In My Collection for flute and piano
Jean Coulthard
Lyric Sonatina for flute and piano (1971)
Edison Denisov
Sonata for flute and piano (1960) 
Sonata for flute and guitar (1977)
Sonata for flute solo (1982) 
Sonata for flute and harp (1983) 
Pierre Max Dubois
Sonata for flute and piano
Henri Dutilleux
Sonatina for flute and piano (1943)
Jindřich Feld
Sonata for flute and piano (1957)
César Franck
Sonata for Violin and Piano in A major (transcribed for flute) (1886)
Frederick the Great
121 sonatas for flute and continuo
Glenn Gould
Sonata for Flute and Piano (1950). (This work is an arrangement of Gould's Sonata for Bassoon and Piano).
George Frideric Handel
Sonata for flute and basso continuo in E minor, HWV 359b
Sonata for flute and basso continuo in G major, HWV 363b
Sonata for flute and basso continuo in B minor, HWV 367b
Sonata for flute and basso continuo in A minor, HWV 374, Halle sonata No. 1 (authenticity uncertain)
Sonata for flute and basso continuo in E minor, HWV 375, Halle sonata No. 2 (authenticity uncertain)
Sonata for flute and basso continuo in B minor, HWV 376, Halle sonata No. 3 (authenticity uncertain)
Sonata for flute and basso continuo in D major, HWV 378
Sonata for flute and basso continuo in E minor, HWV 379
Hans Werner Henze
Sonatina for flute and piano (1947)
Paul Hindemith
Sonata for flute and piano (1936)
Bertold Hummel
Sonatina for flute and piano, Op. 107a (2001) 
Johann Nepomuk Hummel
Sonata in D, Op. 50 (c1810–14)
Sonata in A, Op. 64 (c1814–15)
Philipp Jarnach
Sonatina for flute and piano, Op. 12 (1919)
Sándor Jemnitz
Sonata for flute and piano, Op. 27 (1930–31)
Paul Juon
Sonata for flute and piano in F, Op. 78 (1924)

Sigfrid Karg-Elert
Sonata for flute and piano in B flat, Op. 121 (1918)
Sonata Appassionata for flute solo in F sharp, Op. 140 (1917)
Charles Koechlin
Sonata for flute and piano, Op. 52 (1911–13)
Sonata for 2 flutes, Op. 75 (1918–20)
Three sonatines for solo flute, Op. 184 (1942)
Rachel Laurin
Sonata for flute and piano, Op. 29 (1995)
Jean-Marie Leclair
Sonata for flute and harpsichord No.1 in B major, Book 1, No.2
Sonata for flute and harpsichord No.2 in E minor, Book 1, No.6
Sonata for flute and harpsichord No.3 in E minor, Book 2, No. 1
Sonata for flute and harpsichord No.4 in C major, Book 2, No. 3
Sonata for flute and harpsichord No.5 in G major, Book 2, No. 5
Sonata for flute and harpsichord No.6 in B minor, Book 2, No. 11
Sonata for flute and harpsichord No.7 in E minor, Book 4, No. 2
Sonata for flute and harpsichord No.8 in G major, Book 4, No. 7
Dieter Lehnhoff
Sonata Porteña for flute and piano, Op. 35 (2013)
Bohuslav Martinů
Sonata for flute and piano, Halbreich 306 (1945)
Peter Mieg
Sonata for flute and piano (1963)
Darius Milhaud
Sonatina for flute and piano, Op. 76 (1922)
Ignaz Moscheles
Sonata for flute and piano in A, Op. 44 (1819)
Sonata for flute and piano in G, Op. 79 (1828) 
Wolfgang Amadeus Mozart
Sonata in B-flat for keyboard with flute (or violin) and cello, K. 10
Sonata in G for keyboard with flute (or violin) and cello, K. 11
 Sonata in A for keyboard with flute (or violin) and cello, K. 12
Sonata in F for keyboard with flute (or violin) and cello, K. 13
Sonata in C for keyboard with flute (or violin) and cello, K. 14
Sonata in B-flat for keyboard with flute (or violin) and cello, K. 15
Jules Mouquet
La Flûte de Pan, Sonata, Op. 15
Robert Muczynski
Sonata for flute and piano, Op. 14 (1961)
Gabriel Pierné
Sonata for flute and piano, Op. 36 (1900)
Willem Pijper
Sonata for flute and piano (1925)
Walter Piston
Sonata for flute and piano (1930) 
Francis Poulenc
Flute Sonata, Schmidt 164 (1956–7)
Sergei Prokofiev
Flute Sonata in D, Op. 94 (1943)
Einojuhani Rautavaara
Sonata for flute and guitar (1975) 
Carl Reinecke
Undine, Flute Sonata, Op. 167 (1882)
Ferdinand Ries
Flute Sonata in G major, Op. 48 (pub. 1815)
Divertimento for Piano and Flute in G major, Op.62 (1815, pub. 1819) 
Flute Sonata in C major, Op. 76, No. 1 (1816, pub. ca 1817/18)
Flute Sonata in G major, Op. 76, No. 2 (1817, pub. ca 1817/18)
Flute Sonata in G major, Op. 87 (pub. 1819)
Flute Sonata in E-flat major, Op. 169 Sonate sentimentale (1814, pub. 1834)
Nino Rota
Sonata for flute and harp (1937)
R. Murray Schafer
Sonatina for flute and harpsichord (or piano) (1976)
Erwin Schulhoff
Sonata for flute and piano (1927)
Leo Smit
Sonata for flute and piano (1939–43)
Otar Taktakishvili
Sonata for flute and piano (1968)
Grace Williams
Sonatina for flute and piano (1931)

See also
Flute concerto
Flute repertory

References